Operation Postmaster was a British special operation conducted on the Spanish island of Fernando Po, now known as Bioko, off West Africa in the Gulf of Guinea, during the Second World War. The mission was carried out by the Small Scale Raiding Force (SSRF) and the Special Operations Executive (SOE) in January 1942. Their objective was to board the Italian and German ships in the harbour and sail them to Lagos. The SSRF under the command of Major Gus March-Phillipps left Britain in August 1941 and sailed the Brixham trawler, Maid of Honour, to the Spanish colony.

The British authorities in the area refused to support the raid, which they considered a breach of Spanish neutrality. Permission for the operation to go ahead eventually came from the Foreign Office in London. On 14 January 1942, while the ships' officers were attending a party arranged by an SOE agent, the commandos entered the port aboard two tugs, overpowered the ships' crews and sailed off with the ships, including the Italian merchant vessel Duchessa d'Aosta. The raid boosted SOE's reputation at a critical time and demonstrated its ability to plan and conduct secret operations no matter the political consequences.

Background
In 1941 the British Admiralty started receiving reports that German submarines were using the rivers in Vichy French parts of Africa as a base for refuelling. The unit selected to investigate the reports was the Small Scale Raiding Force (SSRF) also known as No. 62 Commando. The SSRF was formed in 1941, and consisted of a small group of 55 commando-trained personnel working with the Special Operations Executive (SOE). While being under operational control of Combined Operations Headquarters, No. 62 Commando itself was under the command Major Gus March-Phillipps.

Maid of Honour, a 65-ton Brixham yacht trawler, left Poole harbour on 9 August 1941, bound for West Africa. The five man crew were under the command of March-Phillipps. The remainder of the SSRF under the command of Captain Geoffrey Appleyard had departed earlier aboard a troop transport ship. On 20 September 1941 after six weeks under sail Maid of Honour arrived at Freetown, Sierra Leone. Freetown was the agreed rendezvous for both groups, Appleyard's party having arrived at the end of August. After Maid of Honours arrival in Freetown the search for the German submarine bases started. Sailing into the many rivers and deltas in the area, they failed to locate any submarines or evidence of a submarine base.
SOE maintained a presence in West Africa, where it could observe Vichy French, Spanish and Portuguese territories with the intention of identifying and hindering any activities that threatened Britain's colonial possessions.

The three ships were the Italian 8,500-ton merchant vessel Duchessa d'Aosta, the large German tug Likomba, and a diesel-powered barge Bibundi. Duchessa d'Aosta had a working radio which was considered a threat, with the potential to provide details of Allied naval movements. Her declared cargo was 3 million pounds of wool, 316,610 pounds of hides and skins, 1.3 million pounds of tanning materials, 4 million pounds of copra, 544,660 pounds of crude asbestos fibre and over 1.1 million ingots of electrolytic copper. The first page of the ship's cargo manifest, was not presented to the port authorities and the ship's captain refused to provide them with any details, which led to speculation it was also carrying arms or ammunition. In his visits to the island, SOE agent Leonard Guise kept the ships under observation, and in August 1941 submitted a plan to seize Likomba and disable Duchessa d'Aosta. Approval for the military operation in a neutral port was given by the Admiralty on 20 November 1941.

To transport the raiders to the island, two tugs, Vulcan and Nuneaton, were provided by the Governor of Nigeria, Sir Bernard Bourdillon. The raiding force would consist of 32 men, four SOE agents, 11 commandos from the SSRF and 17 men recruited from the local population to crew the two tugs. The mission suffered a blow when the British General Officer Commanding (GOC) West Africa Command, General Sir George Giffard refused to support the mission. He declined to release the 17 men required, stating it would compromise some unnamed plans he had in mind, and that the act would be seen as piracy and could lead to repercussions. Responding to the concerns of the GOC West Africa, the Admiralty suspended the operation. The Foreign Office was also not in favour of the operation, and neither was the British Embassy in Madrid, which was concerned about the possible reactions of the Spanish government. The final go ahead, eventually supported by the Foreign Office, was not given until 6 January 1942, on the grounds that whilst suspicion of British involvement in the raid was inevitable, what counted was the avoidance of any tangible proof.

Mission

SOE agent Richard Lippett had obtained employment with the shipping company John Holt & Co (Liverpool), which had business offices on the island. Having taken up the post he started to make preparations for the raid. He became aware that the crew of Duchessa d'Aosta were in the habit of accepting invitations to parties ashore and had held their own party aboard ship on 6 January 1942. Under the guise of a party-goer Lippett managed to gain information about the readiness of the ship for sea, crew numbers, and the watch arrangements.

The raiders left Lagos in their two tugs on the morning of 11 January 1942, and while en route they practised lowering Folbots and boarding ships at sea under the command of Captain Graham Hayes. They approached Santa Isabel harbour and at 23:15 and 23:30 hours on 14 January 1942; both tugs were in position  outside of the harbour. Onshore, Lippett had arranged for the officers from Duchessa d'Aosta to be invited to a dinner party; 12 Italian officers as well as two German officers from Likomba attended.

The boarding parties assembled on the decks of the two tugs as they entered the harbour. Vulcan, with March-Phillipps and his second in command Appleyard on board, headed for Duchessa d'Aosta.  As they approached, a few men could be seen on the after deck of the merchant vessel, but they seemed to take no notice of the tug other than to shine a torch in its direction. At the same time, Folbots under the command of Hayes from Nuneaton, were being paddled towards Likomba and Burundi, which were moored together. Challenged by a watchman on Burundi, they persuaded him with their reply that it was the ship's captain coming back on board. The men from the canoes boarded Burundi and the two man crew on watch jumped overboard. After attaching explosive charges on the anchor chain, the commandos guided Nuneaton alongside Likomba to take her and the Burundi in tow.

As soon as they were ready, the charges were blown and Nuneaton started to tow Likomba out of the harbour. Eleven men from Vulcan had managed to board Duchessa d'Aosta; while one group attached charges on the anchor chains, another searched below decks collecting prisoners. Blowing the anchor chains, Vulcan started to tow Duchessa d'Aosta out of the harbour. The explosions had alerted the population of the town, who started to gather on the pier, but no attempts were made to stop the ships from leaving. Several anti-aircraft emplacements opened fire at imaginary targets, believing the explosions to have been caused by an aerial attack, but the six-inch guns protecting the harbour itself remained silent. From entering the harbour to leaving with the ships under tow, the operation had taken 30 minutes, without any losses to the raiding party.

Out at sea on 15 January 1942, March-Phillipps established a routine of watches and placed guards on the 29 prisoners they had taken. During the evening they started to have trouble with the tugs' engines and the tow ropes to the captured vessels. The next day Vulcan reached the location for the rendezvous and was "captured" at sea by HMS Violet. Nuneaton, suffering from engine trouble, managed to contact the Nigerian collier Ilorin by semaphore, which in turn contacted Lagos, and a ship was dispatched to tow them into port.

Aftermath
The Special Operations Executive had now demonstrated their ability to undertake operations, no matter the political consequences. Hugh Dalton, the government minister in charge of SOE, informed the British Prime Minister  Winston Churchill, of the outcome of the raid. He also stated his belief that..."other neutral governments would be impressed that Britain would if needed disregard the legal formalities of war in their efforts to succeed." The agent in charge of SOE Africa station submitted a report to the head of SOE Colin Gubbins reflecting on the success of Postmaster: "perhaps next time it will not be necessary for prolonged negotiations before undertaking a 30 minute operation."

The Spanish government was furious about the raid, which was seen as a breach of the country's neutrality. The foreign minister Serrano Suner described the operation as an:

In Germany radio stations reported that a..."British destroyer had entered the harbour and dropped depth charges to blow up the anchor cables and the ship's crew were shot" and the 21 January 1942 edition of Völkischer Beobachter published an article with the headline "British Denials – Admiralty Lies on Act of Piracy". British Naval Intelligence issued their own communique:

On Fernando Po itself, Richard Lippett, who had remained on the island, was taken in for questioning by the Spanish authorities on 17 January 1942. He managed to persuade them he had had nothing to do with the departure of the ships, nor had he spent any money on the party for the ships' officers. He was released from custody on 27 January 1942, but was refused permission to leave the island. He finally left secretly by canoe, arriving in British territory on 1 March 1942. In the aftermath of the operation, Maid of Honour was left in Lagos and eventually sold to the Sierra Leone government as a converted trawler. Duchess d'Aosta was sailed to Greenock and then managed by Canadian Pacific as the Empire Yukon for the Ministry of War Transport. Likomba was managed by the Elder Dempster Lines, who renamed it Malakel in 1947 and then sold it to Liberia in 1948.

After the raid March-Phillipps was awarded the Distinguished Service Order, Hayes was awarded the Military Cross, and Appleyard a Bar to his Military Cross; Lippett and Guise were each appointed Member of the Order of the British Empire. Another commando, and the only professional sailor on the raid, Private Anders Lassen, was the first man to board Duchessa d'Aosta. For conspicuous efficiency in getting the ship under way, Lassen was given a commission in the field, and the immediate award of the Military Cross.

March-Phillipps was killed during Operation Aquatint in September 1942. On the same mission, Hayes evaded capture and crossed the Spanish border, only to be handed over to the Germans who kept him in solitary confinement for nine months before he was executed by firing squad on 13 July 1943. Appleyard later joined the Special Air Service, and on the same day that Hayes was executed Appleyard was reported missing when his plane failed to return from a mission. Lassen also joined the Special Air Service; he was awarded two bars to his MC and promoted to major before receiving a posthumous Victoria Cross in Italy in 1945.

Notes

References

Further reading
 Lett, Brian (2012). Ian Fleming and SOE's Operation Postmaster: The Top Secret Story Behind 007. 
 Harder, Thomas (2021). Special Forces Hero: Anders Lassen VC, MC**. 

Conflicts in 1942
Bioko
History of Equatorial Guinea
Special Operations Executive operations
World War II British Commando raids
African theatres of World War II
1942 in Spain